Simon Says is a  2006 American slasher film, directed by William Dear and starring Crispin Glover and Margo Harshman. It was premiered at Fantastic Fest on 24 September 2006.

Plot
Five teenagers — Kate (Margo Harshman), Zack (Greg Cipes), Vicky, Riff, and Ashley — are on their way to pan for gold during Spring Break when they make a wrong turn. They encounter two strange men, Pig and Garth, who warn them to return home, saying there have been murders in the area. Making their way into town, four of the teens head inside a store, where they meet brothers Simon (Crispin Glover) and Stanley.

Simon is unhelpful, denying the teens requests to buy anything. Frustrated, the group leaves and finds a campsite. Unbeknownst to them, there is someone observing the teens, dressed in a ghillie suit. He chases Ashley through the woods before realizing that she is not 'dream girl' and murders her. The attacker - revealed to be Stanley - begins to cut up her body, saying that he will make her into a present for 'dream girl'.

Back at the store, Zack arrives to find it closed and empty. He lets himself in and discovers numerous bodies hanging from the ceiling, including those of Pig, Garth and Clay. Zack pulls several newspaper articles off the bodies, as he then flees the store. After dark, Simon arrives and tells the teens Stanley is missing. At this moment, a terrified Zack arrives and manages to convince Simon to leave. The teens find their van's tires punctured, stranding them.

The group heads into the forest to look for Ashley and discover that Stanley has made a 'doll' out of Ashley's head, hands, and feet. They are watched by Stanley, who kills Riff, while Simon kills Vicky. Kate is stopped by Simon in his truck, who lies and tells her that the others are safe at his store. Zack sneaks up and climbs into the truck bed as Kate gets into the truck. While they are driving, Simon explains that he and Stanley have lived in the area their entire lives with their parents Quinn and Carrie, and took over the gas station when Quinn and Carrie died. Simon takes Kate to an old campsite where two long-decayed bodies are sitting at a picnic table. He ties her to the table when Stanley appears in his ghillie suit. Suspicious, Simon chops off several of Stanley's fingers with a cleaver, and it's revealed that it is actually Zack in the suit, trying to masquerade as Stanley.

Simon ties Zack to a tree and tortures him. Zack confesses his love to Kate calling her his 'Dream Girl.' This angers Simon and he burns Zack alive. Turning back to Kate, Simon announces that he is also Stanley, having taken over his brother's identity after murdering Quinn and Carrie while the real Stanley is in a coma. Kate seduces Simon, distracting him; he accidentally frees her in the ensuing struggle, allowing her to flee.

Returning to Zack's charred body, Kate promises to kill Simon. Moments later, Simon also approaches the body, vowing to kill her. Kate bursts from Zack's corpse where she was hiding, bringing the cleaver down on Simon's head. He falls to the ground, but when she looks down at where his corpse should be, he is gone. A hand reaches for her just before the film cuts to black.

The film ends with another group of youths arriving at the store asking Simon for directions. Put off by his strange behavior, they leave. Simon goes into the back room and opens a trapdoor, revealing Kate tied up with infant twins before the screen cuts to black.

Cast
Margo Harshman as Kate
Crispin Glover as Simon/Stanley
Greg Cipes as Zack
Carrie Finklea as Vicky
Kelly Vitz as Ashley
Artie Baxter as Riff
Blake Lively as Jenny
Erica Hubbard as Clay
Lori Lively as Lani
Bruce Glover as Sam
Daniella Monet as Sarah
Kelly Blatz as Will
Robyn Lively as Leanne
Ernie Lively as Pig
Bart Johnson as Garth
Chad Cunningham as Young Stanley
Chris Cunningham as Young Simon
Brad Johnson as Quinn
Jillian Hoss as Carrie

References

External links
 
 
 
 
 Simon Says Review on Variety.com

2006 films
American slasher films
American splatter films
2006 horror films
2000s slasher films
Films directed by William Dear
Films with screenplays by William Dear
2000s English-language films
2000s American films